Priscilla Lun (born 21 October 1990) is an American badminton player. She started playing badminton at aged 11, and in 2008, she won the gold medal at the Pan Am Junior Badminton Championships. She also part of the USA women's team who competed at the 2010 Uber Cup in Malaysia.

Achievements

Pan Am Junior Championships
Girls' Doubles

BWF International Challenge/Series
Women's Doubles

Mixed Doubles

 BWF International Challenge tournament
 BWF International Series tournament
 BWF Future Series tournament

References

External links
 

American female badminton players
Living people
1990 births
Place of birth missing (living people)
21st-century American women